A territory is a subdivision of a country having a legal status different from other regions of that country.

Territory may also refer to:
 Box office territory
 Sales territory
 Territoriality (nonverbal communication), how people use space to communicate ownership/occupancy of areas and possessions

Music 
 Territory (Ronnie Montrose album), 1986
 "Territory" (song), a 1993 song by Sepultura
 Territory (Two Hours Traffic album), 2009

Film 
 Territory (1978 film), a 1978 Soviet film
 Territory (2015 film), a 2015 Russian film
 The Territory (1981 film), a 1981 Portuguese film
 The Territory (2022 film), a 2022 American film

Other uses 
 Ford Territory (Australia), a crossover SUV built by Ford Australia
 Ford Territory (China), a crossover SUV built by JMC-Ford
 Spraying (animal behavior) (territorial marking)
 Territory (animal), a geographical area defended by an animal against others of the same species (and occasionally of other species)
 Territory (novel), a 2007 novel by Emma Bull

See also 
 Territorial (Airline) was an official regulation era CAB designation  of a class of airline inclusive of: AS, AQ, HA, RV, and WC, and whose unique geographical route structure and large aircraft operations, did not neatly fit into the CAB's standard; International, Interstate Trunk,  or Local Service, designations.  
 Territorial Army (disambiguation), the name for the Army Reserve in the United Kingdom until 2013, and in some Commonwealth nations
 Territorial tax systems (vs. residency based or hybrid)